A carbon dioxide scrubber is a piece of equipment that absorbs carbon dioxide (CO2). It is used to treat exhaust gases from industrial plants or from exhaled air in life support systems such as rebreathers or in spacecraft, submersible craft or airtight chambers. Carbon dioxide scrubbers are also used in controlled atmosphere (CA) storage. They have also been researched for carbon capture and storage as a means of combating climate change.

Technologies

Amine scrubbing

The primary application for CO2 scrubbing is for removal of CO2 from the exhaust of coal- and gas-fired power plants.  Virtually the only technology being seriously evaluated involves the use of various amines, e.g. monoethanolamine.  Cold solutions of these organic compounds bind CO2, but the binding is reversed at higher temperatures:
CO2  +  2  ↔  + 
, this technology has only been lightly implemented because of capital costs of installing the facility and the operating costs of utilizing it.

Minerals and zeolites
Several minerals and mineral-like materials reversibly bind CO2.  Most often, these minerals are oxides or hydroxides, and often the CO2 is bound as carbonate. Carbon dioxide reacts with quicklime (calcium oxide) to form limestone (calcium carbonate), in a process called carbonate looping. Other minerals include serpentinite, a magnesium silicate hydroxide, and olivine. Molecular sieves also function in this capacity.

Various (cyclical) scrubbing processes have been proposed to remove CO2 from the air or from flue gases and release them in a controlled environment, reverting the scrubbing agent. These usually involve using a variant of the Kraft process which may be based on sodium hydroxide.  The CO2 is absorbed into such a solution, transfers to lime (via a process called causticization) and is released again through the use of a kiln. With some modifications to the existing processes (mainly changing to an oxygen-fired kiln) the resulting exhaust becomes a concentrated stream of CO2, ready for storage or use in fuels. An alternative to this thermo-chemical process is an electrical one which releases the CO2 through electrolyzing of the carbonate solution. While simpler, this electrical process consumes more energy as electrolysis, also splits water. To prevent negating the environmental benefit of using electrolysis over the kiln method, the electricity should come from a renewable (or less emissive than the otherwise needed kiln) source. Early incarnations of environmentally motivated CO2 capture used electricity as the energy source and were therefore dependent on green energy. Some thermal CO2 capture systems use heat generated on-site, which reduces the inefficiencies resulting from off-site electricity production, but it still needs a source of (green) heat, which nuclear power or concentrated solar power could provide.

Sodium hydroxide
Zeman and Lackner outlined a specific method of air capture.

First, CO2 is absorbed by an alkaline NaOH solution to produce dissolved sodium carbonate. The absorption reaction is a gas liquid reaction, strongly exothermic, here:

2NaOH(aq) + CO2(g) → (aq) + (l)

(aq) + (s) → 2NaOH(aq) + (s)

ΔH° = -114.7 kJ/mol

Causticization is performed ubiquitously in the pulp and paper industry and readily transfers 94% of the carbonate ions from the sodium to the calcium cation. Subsequently, the calcium carbonate precipitate is filtered from solution and thermally decomposed to produce gaseous CO2. The calcination reaction is the only endothermic reaction in the process and is shown here:

(s) → CaO(s) + CO2(g)

ΔH° = + 179.2 kJ/mol

The thermal decomposition of calcite is performed in a lime kiln fired with oxygen in order to avoid an additional gas separation step. Hydration of the lime (CaO) completes the cycle. Lime hydration is an exothermic reaction that can be performed with water or steam. Using water, it is a liquid/solid reaction as shown here:

CaO(s) + (l) → (s)

ΔH° = -64.5 kJ/mol

Lithium hydroxide
Other strong bases such as soda lime, sodium hydroxide, potassium hydroxide, and lithium hydroxide are able to remove carbon dioxide by chemically reacting with it. In particular, lithium hydroxide was used aboard spacecraft, such as in the Apollo program, to remove carbon dioxide from the atmosphere. It reacts with carbon dioxide to form lithium carbonate.  Recently lithium hydroxide absorbent technology has been adapted for use in anesthesia machines.  Anesthesia machines which provide life support and inhaled agents during surgery typically employ a closed circuit necessitating the removal of carbon dioxide exhaled by the patient.  Lithium hydroxide may offer some safety and convenience benefits over the older calcium based products.

2 LiOH(s) + 2 (g) → 2 LiOH·(s)
2 LiOH·(s) + CO2(g) → (s) + 3 (g)

The net reaction being:

2LiOH(s) + CO2(g) → (s) + (g)

Lithium peroxide can also be used as it absorbs more CO2 per unit weight with the added advantage of releasing oxygen.

In recent years lithium orthosilicate has attracted much attention towards CO2capture, as well as energy storage. This material offers considerable performance advantages although it requires high temperatures for the formation of carbonate to take place.

Regenerative carbon dioxide removal system
The regenerative carbon dioxide removal system (RCRS) on the Space Shuttle orbiter used a two-bed system that provided continuous removal of carbon dioxide without expendable products. Regenerable systems allowed a shuttle mission a longer stay in space without having to replenish its sorbent canisters. Older lithium hydroxide (LiOH)-based systems, which are non-regenerable, were replaced by regenerable metal-oxide-based systems. A system based on metal oxide primarily consisted of a metal oxide sorbent canister and a regenerator assembly. It worked by removing carbon dioxide using a sorbent material and then regenerating the sorbent material.

Activated carbon
Activated carbon can be used as a carbon dioxide scrubber. Air with high carbon dioxide content, such as air from fruit storage locations, can be blown through beds of activated carbon and the carbon dioxide will adhere to the activated carbon [adsorption]. Once the bed is saturated it must then be "regenerated" by blowing low carbon dioxide air, such as ambient air, through the bed. This will release the carbon dioxide from the bed, and it can then be used to scrub again, leaving the net amount of carbon dioxide in the air the same as when the process was started.

Metal-organic frameworks (MOFs) 
Metal-organic frameworks are one of the most promising new technologies for carbon dioxide capture and sequestration via adsorption. Although no large-scale commercial technology exists nowadays, several research studies have indicated the great potential that MOFs have as a CO2 adsorbent. Its characteristics, such as pore structure and surface functions can be easily tuned to improve CO2 selectivity over other gases.

A MOF could be specifically designed to act like a CO2 removal agent in post-combustion power plants. In this scenario, the flue gas would pass through a bed packed with a MOF material, where CO2 would be stripped. After saturation is reached, CO2 could be desorbed by doing a pressure or temperature swing. Carbon dioxide could then be compressed to supercritical conditions in order to be stored underground or utilized in enhanced oil recovery processes. However, this is not possible in large scale yet due to several difficulties, one of those being the production of MOFs in great quantities.

Another problem is the availability of metals necessary to synthesize MOFs. In a hypothetical scenario where these materials are used to capture all CO2 needed to avoid global warming issues, such as maintaining a global temperature rise less than 2 °C above the pre-industrial average temperature, we would need more metals than are available on Earth. For example, to synthesize all MOFs that utilize vanadium, we would need 1620% of 2010 global reserves. Even if using magnesium-based MOFs, which have demonstrated a great capacity to adsorb CO2, we would need 14% of  2010 global reserves, which is a considerable amount. Also, extensive mining would be necessary, leading to more potential environmental problems.

In a project sponsored by the DOE and operated by UOP LLC in collaboration with faculty from four different universities, MOFs were tested as possible carbon dioxide removal agents in post-combustion flue gas. They were able to separate 90% of the CO2 from the flue gas stream using a vacuum pressure swing process. Through extensive investigation, researchers found out that the best MOF to be used was Mg/DOBDC, which has a 21.7 wt% CO2 loading capacity. Estimations showed that, if a similar system were to be applied to a large scale power plant, the cost of energy would increase by 65%, while a NETL baseline amine based system would cause an increase of 81% (the DOE goal is 35%). Also, each ton of CO2 avoided would cost $57, while for the amine system this cost is estimated to be $72. The project ended in 2010, estimating that the total capital required to implement such a project in a 580 MW power plant was 354 million dollars.

Extend Air Cartridge
An Extend Air Cartridge (EAC) is a make or type of pre-loaded one-use absorbent canister that can be fitted into a recipient cavity in a suitably-designed rebreather.

Other methods
Many other methods and materials have been discussed for scrubbing carbon dioxide.
 Adsorption
 Regenerative carbon dioxide removal system (RCRS)
 Algae filled bioreactors
 Membrane gas separations
 Reversing heat exchangers

See also

References

Scrubbers
Carbon dioxide
Space suit components
Spacecraft life support systems

Gas technologies
Carbon capture and storage